R86 may refer to:

 , an aircraft carrier of the Royal Navy
 R-86 Bad Aibling, a former airfield of the United States Army Air Forces in Germany